The Wider Service Medal was a proposed British campaign medal that was under consideration by the UK Government in the early 21st Century. Its introduction would have seen the creation of a service medal for non-combat operations, with changes to traditional medal eligibility criteria of risk and rigour.

Background 

The 2012 Sir John Holmes Military Medals Review categorised campaign medals as being awarded for operations involving global conflict, large scale military engagements, and minor deployments or actions. A principal factor in the decision to establish new a campaign medal is the level of risk and rigour faced by UK personnel, inclusive of:

 The risk and danger to life.
 The style and force of the enemy.
 The physical and mental stress and rigours experienced by individuals.
 The restrictions, limitations and difficulty in implementing the operation, including climate, weather and terrain.

In reviewing current medal policies, Sir John highlighted the changing nature of warfare and the "huge contributions [made by personnel] to military campaigns but only in supporting or enabling roles." He noted that: "numbers [of personnel] on the front lines in future campaigns may be limited, posing the issue of how to deal with support personnel ever more acutely." Based on these observations, it was recommended that: "The risk and rigour principle should remain the basis of decisions about campaign medals. Particular care needs to continue to be taken about consistency in setting the qualifying criteria for individual medals, to ensure both fairness for that medal, and fairness compared to other comparable medals. There is also a strong case for a separate medal for campaign support, particularly as the nature of warfare changes."

Advocacy 
The UK Ministry of Defence has faced multiple calls for UK non-combat operations to receive medallic recognition.

In January 2015, Lord Moonie queried whether an operational medal would be issued for service on Op Kipion, a long-standing maritime operation in the Gulf and Indian Ocean. In January 2019, a similar question was presented by Andrew Rosindell MP in relation to Op Cabrit in Estonia. In April 2019, John Woodcock MP submitted an Early Day Motion in support of medallic recognition of Op Relentless, a Royal Navy strategic deterrent operation in effect since April 1969.

In February 2020, the Rt Hon Mark Francois MP petitioned the Prime Minister to progress the Wider Service Medal, arguing that members of the British Armed Forces were not appropriately recognised for their service:"...many personnel (...) reported a feeling that the nation no longer really appreciated what they were doing or why they were doing it. An example of this often mentioned by audiences was the lack of medallic recognition for service in some theatres, although there has been and continues to be progress in this area which is welcome. The new Wider Service Medal (WSM) may go some way towards meeting this need for medallic recognition for those who Serve on operations, short of actual combat."

Policy Development 
In July 2012, the Holmes Military Medals Review noted that "the MoD are looking at the introduction of a Campaign Support Medal."

In July 2018, the Ministry of Defence responded to criticism that contemporary deployments, including Op Cabrit in Estonia and Op Orbital in Ukraine, were not medal earning. The MoD Personnel Directorate assured that:"...there is a lot of work currently in progress to identify how individuals who deploy on operations that do not involve facing an armed enemy, including Operations Cabrit and Orbital, might be properly recognised."In July 2019, the Royal Mint, the body responsible for the design of official medals, announced that its Advisory Committee had discussed: "...a new medal to be known as the Wider Service Medal, which is being introduced to acknowledge the role played by a range of service personnel engaged in stressful duties although not necessarily in an open theatre of conflict."In November 2019, the MoD's Army People’s Strategy, a policy paper, announced that: “Work is ongoing to deliver the Wider Service Medal, which formally acknowledges the changing character of warfare.”

In January 2021, the Ministry of Defence declined to release information on the establishment and qualifying criteria of the Wider Service Medal, citing exemption from the Freedom of Information Act (2000). Under Section 35 of the Act, the subject is exempt as it "remains an area of live policy formulation."

On 27 February 2023, Ben Everitt MP requested an update on the creation of a Wider Service Medal. Dr Andrew Murrison MP, Parliamentary Under-Secretary (Ministry of Defence), responded on 6 March 2023 that "no such medal has so far been introduced", but that the subject remains under evaluation.

Design 
The Royal Mint confirmed on 11 December 2018 that it was considering designs for the Wider Service Medal  - “a new official medal”. On 21 March 2019, the Advisory Committee on the Design of Coins, Medals, Seals and Decorations discussed five designs. The Committee reviewed “a summary of the eligibility criteria (...) together with images of the designs prepared.”

Lieutenant Colonel Andy Lucas, Ministry of Defence, “summarised the circumstances in which the medal would be awarded”, and confirmed that the medal would read ‘FOR WIDER SERVICE’.

The chairman, Lord Waldegrave of North Hill, rejected one design as it “reminded him of a Christmas pudding.” The Committee agreed to model a design in which “four arrows suggested global coverage and the presence of the laurel symbolised success.” Edmund de Waal CBE, an English artist, remarked that the selected design was “dignified and looked like an official should.” Sir Thomas Woodcock KCVO, a former member of the Royal Household, concurred that it “was much the best of the designs presented.”

On 25 June 2019, the Advisory Committee endorsed the modelled medal and confirmed it was designed by Timothy Noad, a heraldic artist. Lord Waldegrave “reported that the model had been well received by [senior officials in] the Ministry of Defence.” Medal ribbons were also considered, with a preference for an option that best “represented the most cross-departmental solution.”

References 

British campaign medals
Orders, decorations, and medals of the United Kingdom